Hilda May Williams (1899–1972) was an American nurse who served as nursing supervisor at the University of Connecticut infirmary from 1931 to 1969. She began her career at UConn as a resident nurse for the entire student body. As enrollment grew, the first aid office became a fully fledged clinic or infirmary in 1947, with forty-four inpatient beds for sick or injured students. Williams supervised the infirmary. By 1958 she was supervising fifteen nurses in a reenvisioned University of Connecticut Student Health Service. She retired after thirty-eight years of service in 1969.

Born in Chester, Connecticut, Williams was a registered nurse and a 1925 graduate of the Hartford Hospital School of Nursing. She was a member of Climax Chapter 98 of the Order of the Eastern Star, the Hartford Hospital School of Nursing Alumni Association, and Storrs Congregational Church, United Church of Christ. 

Williams died at Hartford Hospital on March 1, 1972. She was survived by her sister and her two brothers. She never married and had no children.

Built in 1950 and expanded in 1970, UConn's Hilda May Williams Student Health Services Building on Glenbrook Road is named in her honor.

References 

1899 births
1972 deaths
American nurses
American women nurses
University of Connecticut people
20th-century American women
20th-century American people